George Cane (21 October 1881 – 21 September 1968) was a British diver. He competed in the men's 10 metre platform event at the 1908 Summer Olympics.

References

External links
 

1881 births
1968 deaths
British male divers
Olympic divers of Great Britain
Divers at the 1908 Summer Olympics
Place of birth missing